Nan of Music Mountain is a 1917 American silent drama film directed by George Melford and Cecil B. DeMille (who receives no screen credit). The film is based on Frank H. Spearman's novel of the same name and stars Wallace Reid and Anna Little.

Plot
As described in a film magazine, Henry de Spain (Reid) is determined to find the man who murdered his father. He becomes sort of an outsider with Duke Morgan's (Roberts) gang, cattlemen, and outlaws. Nan (Little), daughter of the head of the clan, secretly loves Henry and when he is wounded in a fight with the Morgan clan, she helps him escape. This angers her father and he declares that she shall marry her cousin. Nan dispatches a message to Henry for assistance and he brings her safely to his clan. Nan then learns that her father was the murder of Henry's father. She returns to her father to learn the truth and together they go to Henry and reveal the murder's name. After a thorough understanding and forgiving, Henry and Nan are married.

Cast
 Wallace Reid as Henry de Spain
 Ann Little as Nan Morgan 
 Theodore Roberts as Duke Morgan
 James Cruze as Gale Morgan
 Charles Ogle as Sassoon
 Raymond Hatton as Logan
 Hart Hoxie as Sandusky
 Ernest Joy as Lefever
 Guy Oliver as Bull Page
 James P. Mason as Scott 
 Henry Woodward as Jeffries
 Horace B. Carpenter as McAlpin

Reception
Like many American films of the time, Nan of Music Mountain was subject to cuts by city and state film censorship boards. The Chicago Board of Censors required a cut of the shooting of a rancher during a vision, the intertitle "You'll go home when I get through with you", and the last shooting by de Spain.

References

External links

Spearman, Frank H. (1916), Nan of Music Mountain, New York: Charles Scribner's Sons, on the Internet Archive

1917 films
1917 drama films
Silent American drama films
American silent feature films
American black-and-white films
Films based on American novels
Films directed by Cecil B. DeMille 
Films directed by George Melford
Films shot in California
1910s American films
1910s English-language films